Amblypygi is an order of arachnid chelicerate arthropods also known as whip spiders or tailless whip scorpions (not to be confused with whip scorpions or vinegaroons that belong to the related order Thelyphonida). The name "amblypygid" means "blunt tail", a reference to a lack of the flagellum that is otherwise seen in whip scorpions. Amblypygids possess no silk glands or venomous fangs. They rarely bite if threatened, but can grab fingers with their pedipalps, resulting in thorn-like puncture injuries.

As of 2016, 5 families, 17 genera and around 155 species had been discovered and described. They are found in tropical and subtropical regions worldwide; they are mainly found in warm and humid environments and like to stay protected and hidden within leaf litter, caves, or underneath bark. Some species are subterranean; all are nocturnal. Fossilized amblypygids have been found dating back to the Carboniferous period, such as Weygoldtina.

Description

Their bodies are broad and highly flattened, with a solid carapace and a segmented abdomen, or opisthosoma. Most species have eight eyes; a pair of median eyes at the front of the carapace above the chelicerae and 2 smaller clusters of three eyes each further back on each side.

Amblypygids have raptorial pedipalps modified for grabbing and retaining prey, much like those of a mantis; recent work suggests that the pedipalps display sexual dimorphism in their size and shape. The first pair of legs act as sensory organs and are not used for walking. The sensory legs are very thin and elongate, have numerous sensory receptors, and can extend several times the length of the body.

Behavior

Amblypygids have eight legs, but use only six for walking, often in a crab-like, sideways fashion. The front pair of legs are modified for use as antennae-like feelers, with many fine segments giving the appearance of a "whip". When a suitable prey is located with the antenniform legs, the amblypygid seizes its victim with large spines on the grasping pedipalps, impaling and immobilizing the prey. This is typically done while climbing the side of a vertical surface and looking downward at their prey. Pincer-like chelicerae then work to grind and chew the prey prior to ingestion. The tailless whip scorpion may go for over a month in which no food is eaten; often this is due to premolt. Due to the lack of venom the tailless whip scorpion is very nervous in temperament, retreating away if any dangerous threat is sensed by the animal.

Courtship involves the male depositing stalked spermatophores, which have one or more sperm masses at the tip, onto the ground, and using his pedipalps to guide the female over them. She gathers the sperm and lays fertilized eggs into a sac carried under the abdomen, or opisthosoma. When the young hatch, they climb up onto the mother's back; any which fall off before their first molt will not survive.

Some species of amblypygids, particularly Phrynus marginemaculatus and Damon diadema, may be among the few examples of arachnids that exhibit social behavior. Research conducted at Cornell University suggests that mother amblypygids communicate with their young with her antenniform front legs, and the offspring reciprocate both with their mother and siblings. The ultimate function of this social behavior remains unknown. Amblypygids hold territories that they defend from other individuals.

The amblypygid diet mostly consists of arthropod prey, but these opportunistic predators have also been observed feeding on vertebrates. Amblypygids generally do not feed before, during, and after molting. Like other arachnids, an amblypygid will molt several times during its life. Molting is done from hanging from the underside of a horizontal surface in order to use gravity to assist in separating the old exoskeleton from the animal.

As pets
Several species of Amblypygi are sold and kept as pets including Damon diadema, Damon medius, Damon variegatus, Euphrynichus amanica, Heterophrynus batesii, Acanthophrynus coronatus, Phrynus marginemaculatus and Paraphrynus mexicanus. Tailless whip scorpions are kept in tall (>45 cm; >18 in) glass enclosures which allow for two things: Enough vertical space for climbing and moulting, and enough space for heat to dissipate in order to keep the enclosure between 70 °F and 75 °F. Five centimetres (two inches) of substrate at the bottom of the enclosure is generally sufficient to allow for burrowing and also serves as a method to retain water in order to keep the humidity above 75%. Tailless whip scorpions live anywhere between 5–10 years. Feeding can include small insects such as crickets, mealworms, and roaches.

Genera

The following genera are recognised:
 Palaeoamblypygi Weygoldt, 1996
 Paracharontidae Weygoldt, 1996
 Paracharon Hansen, 1921 (1 described species +1 undescribed species, West Africa, northern South America)
 †Paracharonopsis Engel & Grimaldi, 2014 (1 species, Cambay amber, India, Eocene)
 Weygoldtinidae Dunlop, 2018
 †Weygoldtina Dunlop, 2018 (2 species, Upper Carboniferous Europe, North America)
 Euamblypygi Weygoldt, 1996
 Charinidae Weygoldt, 1996
 Charinus Simon, 1892 (33 species)
Sarax Simon, 1892 (10 species)
Weygoldtia Miranda, Giupponi, Prendini & Scharff, 2018 (3 species)
Neoamblypygi Weygoldt, 1996
Charontidae Simon, 1892
Catageus Thorell, 1889 (9 species)
Charon Karsch, 1879 (5 species)
Unidistitarsata Engel & Grimaldi, 2014
†Kronocharon Engel & Grimaldi, 2014  (1 species, Burmese amber, Myanmar, Cretaceous)
†Burmacharon? Hu et al. 2020 (1 species, Burmese amber, Myanmar, Cretaceous)
Phrynoidea Blanchard, 1852
Phrynichidae Simon, 1900
Damon C. L. Koch, 1850 (10 species)
Euphrynichus Weygoldt, 1995 (2 species)
Musicodamon Fage, 1939 (1 species)
Phrynichodamon Weygoldt, 1996 (1 species)
Phrynichus Karsch, 1879 (16 species)
Trichodamon Mello-Leitão, 1935 (2 species)
Xerophrynus Weygoldt, 1996 (1 species)
Phrynidae Blanchard, 1852
Acanthophrynus Kraepelin, 1899 (1 species)
†Britopygus Dunlop & Martill, 2002 (1 species; Crato Formation, Brazil, Cretaceous)
Heterophrynus Pocock, 1894 (14 species)
Paraphrynus Moreno, 1940 (18 species)
Phrynus Lamarck, 1801 (28 species, Oligocene - Recent)
Incertae sedis:
 † Sorellophrynus Harvey, 2002 (1 species, Upper Carboniferous, North America)
 † Thelyphrynus Petrunkevich, 1913 (1 species, Upper Carboniferous, North America)

References

External links

Amblypigid video summarizing research from University of Nebraska's Eben Gering
Amblypygi. The Antillean (West Indian) fauna.

 
Arachnid orders
Extant Pennsylvanian first appearances
Prehistoric arthropod orders
Carboniferous arachnids
Permian arachnids
Mesozoic arachnids
Cenozoic arachnids